Jon Hewitt (born 1959) is an Australian film director. He is married to actress Belinda McClory.

Select credits
 Bloodlust (1992)
 Redball (1999)
 Darklovestory (2007)
 Acolytes (2008)
 X: Night of Vengeance (2011)
 Turkey Shoot (2014)

References

External links

Jon Hewitt at Melbourne Independent Filmmakers

Australian film directors
Living people
1959 births